Yeongwol Challenger Tennis is a professional tennis tournament played on outdoor hard courts in Yeongwol County, South Korea. The first event was held in November 2013. Although the actual prize money is $35,000, the tournament belongs to the category of $50,000 and the ranking point is 80 for the winner, and 48 for the runner-up.

Past finals

Men's singles

Men's doubles

References 

 
ATP Challenger Tour
Sport in Gangwon Province, South Korea
Hard court tennis tournaments
Tennis tournaments in South Korea
Recurring sporting events established in 2013
2013 in South Korean tennis